The Wisconsin Center (formerly Midwest Express Center, Midwest Airlines Center, Frontier Airlines Center and Delta Center) is a convention and exhibition center located in downtown Milwaukee, Wisconsin.  The center is part of a greater complex of buildings which includes the UW–Milwaukee Panther Arena and the Miller High Life Theatre, and was a replacement for the former Great Hall portion of the MECCA Complex. The building was previously named after its sponsor Delta Air Lines, who had purchased naming rights to the facility in August 2012. On June 30, 2013, Delta terminated its naming rights at the center and the facility was officially renamed the "Wisconsin Center" the following day.

The convention center hosted the 2020 Democratic National Convention. The event was initially planned to be held in the nearby Fiserv Forum but was ultimately downsized due to the COVID-19 pandemic.

Description
The convention center was opened in two phases, the first completed in 1998, and the second completed in 2000. It provides  of contiguous exhibit space along with a  ballroom. Skywalks connect the convention center to the nearby Hilton (Hilton Milwaukee City Center) and Hyatt hotels.

The venue is operated by the Wisconsin Center District, which also operates the adjacent UW–Milwaukee Panther Arena and Miller High Life Theatre.

The naming rights were initially sold to Midwest Airlines. On April 13, 2010, Republic Airways Holdings CEO Bryan Bedford announced that the name would change to Frontier Airlines Center, coinciding with the consolidation of brands between Frontier Airlines and Midwest Airlines. On August 15, 2012, Delta Air Lines purchased the building's naming rights as part of the carrier's recent expansion at Milwaukee's General Mitchell International Airport. The facility changed its name from the Frontier Airlines Center to the Delta Center effective from September 19, 2012; signage was replaced accordingly in November.

The center is the largest design-build project in Wisconsin. Art was incorporated early in the design stage; the Hilton's skywalk entrance foyer floor features a green floor mosaic in the shape of Wisconsin, with Michigan depicted in gold, Minnesota in pink, Iowa in red, and Illinois in gray.
Region inlays represent area industries and dairy cows. A half-dozen flush bronze containers contain different soil types.

The venue straddles West Wells Street.

The center's architecture reinterprets the many historic German buildings found in downtown Milwaukee. Along with art-as-design features, the John J. Burke Family Collection is scattered throughout the interior. On the Vel R. Phillips Ave side of the center is an outdoor reliquary garden named City Yard. Created by artist Sheila Klein, it contains many iconic items from Milwaukee's DPW such as fire hydrants and the classic blue police call box. Within this area are planters containing ginkgo trees and a large monument with four limestone lion heads set in relief. These architectural elements were salvaged from the AT&T building that once stood nearby.

Artist Vito Acconci created an indoor-outdoor sculpture titled Walkways Through the Wall.  Designed to integrate private and public space, these curled terra cotta colored concrete strips flow through structural boundaries and provide seating at both ends.

Notable events
Alongside the Hyatt Regency Milwaukee, the center hosted the 2004 Green National Convention. The first three days of the convention were held at the Hyatt Regency, while the final day was held at the convention center.

The center hosted the 2020 Democratic National Convention. The event was initially planned to be held in the nearby Fiserv Forum but was ultimately downsized due to the COVID-19 pandemic.

Expansion
An expansion is under construction.

In December 2019, Eppstein Uhen Architects and tvsdesign were selected  by the Wisconsin Center District to be the architecture team of the expansion project. In January 2020, Gilbane Building Company and C.D. Smith were awarded the construction management contract for the expansion. In February 2020, the Milwaukee Common Council granted the Wisconsin Center District Board approval to finance the planned $420 million expansion to the venue. In April 2020, the Wisconsin Center District Board approved the expansion. In the autumn of 2020, the Wisconsin Center District sold bonds to finance the expansion. Plans are to pay off the bonds over a 40-year period, through Milwaukee County hotel, restaurant, and car rental taxes levied by the Wisconsin Center District, with debt payments beginning in 2027. Site work for the expansion began in the summer of 2021. The groundbreaking ceremony was held on October 28, 2021.

Designed by Eppstein Uhen Architects and tvsdesign, the expansion will differ in architectural style from the existing structure, being more modern and glassy.

The expansion will double the venue's square footage by adding an additional 112,000 square feet of exhibition space. The expansion is designed to enable the venue to hold two conventions simultaneously, with the convention center's new wing having its own separate entrance, and including a second ballroom. Other additions the expansion will include are an outdoor terrace, new meeting rooms, additional loading dock, and new indoor parking spots.

The expansion is being built atop land previously occupied by parking lots on the block of the convention center between West Wells Street and West Kilbourn Avenue.

In May 2022, the Wisconsin Center District board disclosed that the final cost of the expansion will likely be double the original estimate of $420 million, with the board laying blame on inflation.

References

External links
Official website

Convention centers in Wisconsin
Buildings and structures in Milwaukee
Tourist attractions in Milwaukee